The Summit Fire was a wildfire that started on May 22, 2008 in the Santa Cruz Mountains, near Corralitos, California, United States. The fire was fully contained on May 27, 2008. No injuries or fatalities occurred, with the exception of twelve firefighters who received minor sprains, cuts and strains.

The fire prompted mandatory evacuations of homes in the area. Several elementary, middle, and high schools were closed following the fire. California Governor Arnold Schwarzenegger declared a state of emergency for Santa Cruz County. The cause of the fire was an unattended burn pile
.

The fire has approached the area  to the east which was consumed in October 2002 - the Croy Fire.

Evacuations
The fire affected Santa Clara and Santa Cruz Counties. Approximately 1,400 homes were evacuated. Of them 336 were mandatory. More than 2900 firefighters fought the fire. Residents were ordered to evacuate the area shortly before 3 PM. The fire also affected Maymens Flat, a tiny community of fewer than ten homes.

Response
A state of emergency was declared by Arnold Schwarzenegger. He excused himself during a meeting with presidential candidate John McCain to comment on the fire.

References

2008 California wildfires
Evacuations
Wildfires in Santa Cruz County, California
May 2008 events in the United States